Aiichiro Nakano from the University of Southern California, was awarded the status of Fellow in the American Physical Society, after they were nominated by their Division of Computational Physics in 2009, for the development and implementation of scalable parallel and distributed algorithms for large-scale atomistic simulations to predict, visualize, and analyze reaction processes for novel nano-mechano-chemical phenomena encompassing diverse spatiotemporal scales.

References 

Fellows of the American Physical Society
American Physical Society
21st-century American physicists
Living people
University of Tokyo alumni
Year of birth missing (living people)